The 2017 Bonnaroo Music Festival was held June 8 to 11, 2017 in Manchester, Tennessee. This marked the sixteenth consecutive festival since its inception in 2002. The attendance increased up to forty percent from the previous year, reaching more than 65,000 people. The headliners were Irish rock band U2, Canadian singer The Weeknd, American rapper Chance the Rapper, and American rock band Red Hot Chili Peppers.

Set lists
Here are the lists of songs performed at 2017 Bonnaroo by the headliners.
{{Hidden
| headercss = background: #add8e6; font-size: 100%; width: 100%;  
| contentcss = text-align: left; font-size: 100%; width: 100%; 
| header = U2
| content =

"Sunday Bloody Sunday"
"New Year's Day"
"Pride (In the Name of Love)"

The Joshua Tree Set
"Where the Streets Have No Name"
"I Still Haven't Found What I'm Looking For"
"With or Without You"
"Bullet the Blue Sky"
"Running to Stand Still"
"Red Hill Mining Town"
"In God's Country"
"Trip Through Your Wires"
"One Tree Hill"
"Exit"
"Mothers of the Disappeared"

Encore
"Beautiful Day"
"Elevation"
"Vertigo"
"Ultraviolet (Light My Way)"
"One"

}}
{{Hidden
| headercss = background: #add8e6; font-size: 100%; width: 100%;  
| contentcss = text-align: left; font-size: 100%; width: 100%; 
| header = Red Hot Chili Peppers
| content =

"Intro Jam"
"Can't Stop"
"Dani California"
"Scar Tissue"
"Dark Necessities"
"The Adventures of Rain Dance Maggie"
"I Wanna Be Your Dog"
"Right on Time"
"Go Robot"
"Californication"
"What Is Soul?"
"Aeroplane"
"Snow ((Hey Oh))"
"Suck My Kiss"
"Soul to Squeeze"
"By the Way"

Encore
"Goodbye Angels"
"Give It Away"

}}

{{Hidden
| headercss = background: #add8e6; font-size: 100%; width: 100%;  
| contentcss = text-align: left; font-size: 100%; width: 100%; 
| header = The Weeknd
| content =

"Starboy"
"Party Monster"
"Reminder"
"Six Feet Under"
"Low Life"
"Might Not"
"Sidewalks"
"Often"
"Acquainted"
"Or Nah"
"Tell Your Friends"
"Wicked Games"
"Earned It"
"In the Night"
"Rockin'"
"Secrets"
"Can't Feel My Face"
"I Feel It Coming"

Encore
"The Hills"

}}

Line-ups
The information was taken from Pass the Aux website. Artists listed from earliest to latest set times.

Thursday, June 8 
This Tent: Luke Combs, Hippo Campus, July Talk, Mondo Cozmo, Eden, Kevin Abstract
That Tent: Welles, Twiddle, The Orwells, The Lemon Twigs, Turkuaz, Kaiydo
The Other: Goldfish, Innanet James, Haywyre, Herobust, G Jones, Ookay
Who Stage: Walden, James Hersey, Two Feet, Charlotte Cardin, Dermot Kennedy, Allan Rayman
New Music on Tap Lounge: Zipper Club, Corey Harper, Mt. Joy, Ten Fé, Johnny Balik

Friday, June 9 
What Stage: Léon, Francis and the Lights, Kaleo, The xx, U2
Which Stage: Klangstof, The Strumbellas, Cold War Kids, Tove Lo, Glass Animals, Major Lazer
This Tent: Twin Limb, Khruangbin, Car Seat Headrest, James Vincent McMorrow, Gallant, Portugal. The Man
That Tent: Wilderado, Kevin Morby, Stick Figure, Angélique Kidjo, Preservation Hall Jazz Band, Russ
The Other: Barclay Crenshaw, Ganja White Night, D.R.A.M., Illenium, Getter, Nghtmre, Claude VonStroke, Big Gigantic
Who Stage: Sweet Sweet, Walker Lukens, Blossoms, Albin Lee Meldau, Nightly, Jack Harlow
New Music on Tap Lounge: Magic City Hippies, Springtime Carnivore, Lanco, Jay Som, Great Good Fine Ok

Saturday, June 10 
What Stage: The Front Bottoms, Jon Bellion, Future Islands, Chance the Rapper, Red Hot Chili Peppers
Which Stage: COIN, Rainbow Kitten Surprise, Tegan and Sara, The Head and the Heart, Cage the Elephant, Flume
This Tent: Big Jesus, Lukas Nelson & Promise of the Real, Belly, Michael Kiwanuka, Warpaint, Superjam
That Tent: Lucy Dacus, Deap Vally, Joseph, Bad Suns, Tory Lanez, Shpongle
The Other: DJ Mel, Unlike Pluto, San Holo, Rezz, Matoma, Louis the Child, Snails, Marshmello
Who Stage: Reuben Bidez, Alekesam, Waker, Malcom London, Goody Grace
New Music on Tap Lounge: Unbreakable Bloodline, Creature Comfort, Ruen Brothers, Urban Cone, Cloves

Sunday, June 11 
What Stage: White Reaper, Royal Blood, Milky Chance, Lorde, The Weeknd
Which Stage: Cam, Margo Price, Umphrey's McGee, Crystal Castles, Travis Scott
This Tent: Tank and the Bangas, Noname, Dua Lipa, Aminé, Flatbush Zombies, BadBadNotGood
That Tent: River Whyless, Aaron Lee Tasjan, Mandolin Orange, Greensky Bluegrass, Superjam
The Other: Case Bloom, Jason Huber, Vanic, Skepta, Borgore, Yellow Claw
Who Stage: Flint Eastwood, Yoshi Flower, Tucker Beathard, Ella Vos, Jacob Collier
New Music on Tap Lounge: Backup Planet, Baskery, Sweet Crude, Ethan Gruska, Njomza

References

External links 
Official Bonnaroo site

Bonnaroo Music Festival by year
2017 music festivals